= Earl Stoltenow =

American politician (1924–2017)

Member of the North Dakota House of Representatives from the 25th district
- In office 1967–1974

Personal details
- Born: February 10, 1924 Grand Bend, North Dakota
- Died: October 23, 2017 (aged 93)
- Party: Republican
- Profession: farmer

Earl L. Stoltenow (February 10, 1924 – October 23, 2017) was an American politician who was a member of the North Dakota House of Representatives. He represented the 25th district from 1967 to 1974 as a member of the Republican party. An alumnus of the University of North Dakota, he was a farmer.
